Ping was an Asian restaurant in Portland, Oregon.

History 
Chef Andy Ricker and restaurateur Kurt Huffman opened the original Ping in 2009, in the space previously occupied by Hung Far Low in Old Town Chinatown. The restaurant closed in 2012, following an economic downturn and Ricker's departure.

Eight years later, in December 2020, Huffman reopened Ping alongside Mike Kessler, a chef who had worked in the original's kitchen, in southeast Portland's Hosford-Abernethy neighborhood. Ping's second launch was even shorter-lived; by mid-2021 the restaurant declared a hiatus on its Instagram account, from which it did not return. Its last post was dated July 17, 2021. By December 2021 its website was inaccessible.

See also 

 List of defunct restaurants of the United States

References

2009 establishments in Oregon
2012 disestablishments in Oregon
2020 establishments in Oregon
Defunct Asian restaurants in Portland, Oregon
Hosford-Abernethy, Portland, Oregon
Northwest Portland, Oregon
Old Town Chinatown
Restaurants disestablished in 2012
Restaurants disestablished in 2021
Restaurants established in 2009
Restaurants established in 2020